Herbert Lawrence Meeker (March 19, 1905 – December 28, 1960) was an American football player. He played college football for Washington State University and in the National Football League (NFL) as a back for the Providence Steam Roller in 1930 and 1931. He appeared in 20 NFL games, six as a starter.

Meeker was born in Spokane, Washington, and played at Lewis and Clark High School in the same city. He chose Washington State instead of the University of Washington and graduated in 1928 with a degree in journalism. Meeker worked at newspapers and at a retail butcher after his professional playing career ended. Meeker is the namesake of Butch T. Cougar, the mascot of the Washington State Cougars football team.

References

1905 births
1960 deaths
Washington State Cougars football players
Providence Steam Roller players
Players of American football from Washington (state)